"The Funeral" is a song by English musician Yungblud, released on 11 March 2022 as the lead single from his third studio album Yungblud (2022). The song was released by labels Locomotion Recordings and Geffen Records. "The Funeral" was written by Yungblud, Chris Greatti, Jake Torrey and Jordan Gable, and produced by Greatti. The music video for the song, also released on 11 March 2022, was directed by Christian Breslauer and features legendary English television personalities and music royalty Ozzy and Sharon Osbourne.

Live performances
On 28 March 2022, Yungblud performed "The Funeral" on The Late Late Show with James Corden. On 26 April 2022, he performed the song on German talk show Late Night Berlin. In addition to these performances, a live version of the song was included on "The Funeral" extended play (EP), recorded at the Shrine Auditorium in Los Angeles, California.

Track listing
"The Funeral" – digital download / streaming
 "The Funeral" – 3:31

"The Funeral" – extended play (EP)
 "The Funeral" – 3:31
 "The Funeral" (acoustic) – 3:33
 "The Funeral" (live from the Shrine) – 4:01
 "The Funeral" (demo) – 0:40

Credits and personnel
Credits adapted from Tidal.

 Yungblud – vocals, songwriter
 Chris Greatti – producer, songwriter, bass, drums, guitar, programming
 Jake Torrey – songwriter
 Jordan Gable – songwriter
 Mike Crossey – engineer, mixing engineer
 Robin Schmidt – engineer
 Stephen Sesso – additional engineer

Charts

Notes

References

2022 singles
2022 songs
Yungblud songs
Geffen Records singles
Songs written by Yungblud
Songs about death